Juan Carlos de La Cuesta is a Colombian executive and the ex chairman of Atlético Nacional of the Categoría Primera A. He is a former accountant and financial manager for first Postobón and subsequently Organización Ardila Lülle, as well as serving as the club's own finance manager.

References

Colombian businesspeople
Living people
Year of birth missing (living people)
Place of birth missing (living people)